Oberbefehlshaber West (German: initials OB West), German for "high commander in the West") was the overall commander of the Westheer, the German armed forces on the Western Front during World War II. It was directly subordinate to the  Oberkommando der Wehrmacht (the German armed forces High Command). The area under the command of the OB West varied as the war progressed. At its farthest extent it reached the French Atlantic coast. By the end of World War II in Europe it was reduced to commanding troops in Bavaria.

Commanders

Order of battle from June 1944 to January 1945

References
Oberbefehlshaber West, German Army, 06.06.1944

German High Command during World War II